Choctaw Casinos & Resorts is a chain of seven Native American casinos and hotels located in Oklahoma, owned and operated by the Choctaw Nation of Oklahoma.

The original location in Durant has  of gaming floor, over 4,200 slot machines, and 776 hotel rooms. The resort has two casinos and two hotels within the complex. Choctaw Inn has 101 hotel rooms, and the newer Grand Tower has  of floor space, 330 rooms and suites, and is 12 floors tall. The $360 million resort is the flagship of the Choctaw Nation gaming industry.

Locations
 Choctaw Casino–Broken Bow
 Choctaw Casino–Idabel
 Choctaw Casino–McAlester
 Choctaw Casino–Stringtown
 Choctaw Casino & Resort–Durant (flagship)
 Choctaw Casino & Resort–Grant
 Choctaw Casino & Resort–Pocola

History

The Choctaw Casino Resort sits on a 50-acre site, adjacent to the former Choctaw Casino Bingo. The Choctaw Casino Bingo was built in 1987 and was the first of the Choctaw gaming franchise. In 2006, the original $60 million resort (now known as the South Casino) was completed with the construction. Soon after completion, tribal officials determined they built too small for their clientele and went underway with an expansion. In February 2010, a larger casino was built adjacent to the existing resort and became known as the North Casino. The Grand Hotel Tower is built atop the North Casino. The Bingo Hall then closed, shortly after the opening of the expansion.

Durant

Tourism

The Choctaw Casino Resort and Choctaw Casino Bingo complex is a major tourist destination for Durant, the State of Oklahoma, North Texas, including the Dallas–Fort Worth metroplex, Arkansas, Louisiana, and Kansas. Some 5,000-6,000 people patronize the facility each week, about 300,000 annually. About 81 percent of the casino's customers are from Texas, and the casino is heavily marketed on television, radio, and the internet to people in the Dallas–Fort Worth area. Marketing materials put emphasis on the casino's location as being "One Hour North of Dallas."

Facilities

The Oasis
In addition to the casino's gaming floor, the Choctaw Casino & Resort features The Oasis swimming area where visitors will find multiple pool areas, water slides, Jacuzzis, cabanas, and dive-in movies being shown on an inflatable screen during the summer months.

Choctaw Wellness Center
The Choctaw Wellness Center has amenities including a full gymnasium and an indoor walking track.

The District
Completed in September 2015, the District is an entertainment center with attractions including a video arcade, movie theater, bowling alley, and laser tag arena. The District is a non-smoking area.

Choctaw Nation
The Choctaw casinos in Oklahoma are owned and operated by the Choctaw Nation of Oklahoma. Proceeds from the casino are used to fund many development programs benefiting local communities and the Choctaw Nation of Oklahoma.

Sources
Choctaw Casinos Oklahoma
Choctaw Nation of Oklahoma
Oklahoma Indian Gaming Association
National Indian Gaming Commission
Choctaw Casino Resort - The District

References

External links

Choctaw Nation of Oklahoma
Casinos in Oklahoma
Buildings and structures in Bryan County, Oklahoma
Native American casinos
Tourist attractions in Bryan County, Oklahoma
Casino hotels